Brij Kishore Sharma (born c.1946) is an Indian former politician.

He was born in 1946, the eldest son of Nawal Kishore Sharma, the Governor of Gujarat State (2004-2009), and Munni Devi.

In 1968 he obtained a Diploma in Electrical Engineering from the Rajasthan Board of Technical Education.

In 2008, Sharma contested the Rajasthan Legislative Assembly elections, as the Indian National Congress candidate, for the Hawa Mahal constituency. He polled 44,926 votes (41% of the total vote) winning the seat by a margin of 580 votes, defeating the Bharatiya Janata Party candidate, Manju Sharma, the daughter of Bhanwar Lal Sharma.

Sharma was subsequently appointed as Education Minister in Chief Minister Ashok Gehlot's Cabinet.

At the 2013 Rajasthan Legislative Assembly elections he lost the seat to Surendra Pareek, the former member for Hawa Mahal, by 12,715 votes.

References 

Rajasthani politicians
State cabinet ministers of Rajasthan
Rajasthan MLAs 2008–2013
Indian National Congress politicians
Living people
Year of birth missing (living people)